Todd Polinchock is a former representative of the 144th Legislative District of Pennsylvania, United States. He was first elected in 2018, winning against Democrat Meredith Buck. Before entering politics, he served in the United States Navy for 20 years and became a full commander before eventually retiring and becoming a realtor, becoming the president of the Pennsylvania Association of Realtors in 2016. He was re-elected in 2020, then defeated in 2022 by Democrat Brian Munroe.

During his term, Polinchook supported policies to stop climate change, becoming the first Republican to support a bill by fellow representative Chris Rabb aiming to transition the state to completely using renewable energy sources by 2050. In 2019, he introduced a bill allowing agritourism at small farms and orchards where local ordinances prohibited them. During the COVID-19 pandemic, he said that societal shutdowns were necessary, though he preferred giving control of measures to counties and thought the restrictions imposed by Governor Tom Wolf were too strict. Polinchock says he supports bipartisanship over partisan politics.

Polinchock has 2 children and is a Catholic.

Polinchock sat on the Gaming Oversight, Human Services, Professional Licensure, and Veterans Affairs & Emergency Preparedness committees.

References

Republican Party members of the Pennsylvania House of Representatives
Catholics from Pennsylvania
Year of birth missing (living people)
Living people
21st-century American politicians